Fauresmith is located 130 km south west of Bloemfontein, South Africa. The town, named after Rev Phillip Faure and Sir Harry Smith, is the second oldest town in the Free State.

Fauresmith is the only town in South Africa, and one of only three in the world, where the railway line runs down the centre of the main road.

The town is well known in equestrian circles for the annual National Equestrian Endurance Race, during which the horses and riders must complete a grueling 205 km course during the three days of the event.

Winters are extremely cold with temperatures often below freezing.

History
With the settlement of Europeans in the region, there was a need for a church. They wanted a farm for this purpose. After much negotiation (without success) with the British Government, a temporary church was built on the farm "Sannahspoort" – currently Fauresmith. The church council later bought Sannahspoort for 14 000 rixdollars (£1050). Immediately stands were sold to get the funds necessary to build a permanent church. An interesting condition of sale was that no spirits or other strong liquor may have been sold on any of the plots.  The selling of plots was the biggest income of the church at the time. The current congregations of the surrounding towns of Philippolis, Trompsburg, Edenburg, Petrusburg, Koffiefontein, Luckhoff and a great deal of Jacobsdal were part of the congregation.

Two years before the founding of the town, the intervention of the British government in the affairs of the Free State led to the military clash between Boer and Briton at the Battle of Boomplaats, about 30 km from the current Fauresmith.

On August 30, 1851, a meeting was held at Sannahspoort. The heading of the minutes, states "Fauresmith."

After Bloemfontein, Fauresmith was the most important town in the Free State. The first House of Assembly had to choose between the two to determine which would be the capital of the Free State. The vote went to Bloemfontein with a two-vote majority.

Archaeology

Fauresmith is the name site for a stone tool industry that is often defined as a transitional industry between the Acheulian and the Middle Stone Age or as the end of the Acheulian or beginning of the MSA. The Fauresmith is found at a number of other archaeological sites such as Wonderwerk Cave and Kathu Pan where it is potentially dated to at least 420,000 years ago. The Fauresmith consists of MSA technology such as blades, points and prepared core technology as well as retaining handaxes from the Acheulian. The type sites are Brakfontien 321 and Riverview Estates Site VI.

References

Herries, A.I.R. 2011. A chronological perspective on the Acheulian and its transition to the Middle Stone Age in southern Africa: the question of the Fauresmith. International Journal of Evolutionary Biology, 961401, .
Van Riet Lowe, C. 1927. The Archaeology of the Vaal River Basin. In Söhnge, P.G., Visser, D.J.L. & Van Riet Lowe, C. (eds). The Geology and Archaeology of the Vaal River Basin. 61-164. Geological Survey Memoirs 35

Populated places in the Kopanong Local Municipality
Populated places established in 1849
1849 establishments in Africa